Peam Bang is a village and commune in Stoung District, Kampong Thom Province, Cambodia. According to the 1998 census of Cambodia it had a total population of 2,218 people, living in 391 households.  The Tonle Sap is the most prominent geographical feature; the village lies on its banks. It contains the Boeng Tonle Chhmar reserve. Studies conducted in 2008 revealed that only about 39% of the communal population were educated.

References

Communes of Kampong Thom Province
Villages in Cambodia